The Chillum Road Line, designated as Routes F1 & F2 is a daily bus route operated by the Washington Metropolitan Area Transit Authority between Cheverly station of the Orange Line of the Washington Metro and Takoma station of the Red Line. The line operates every 25–38 minutes during peak hours, 60 minutes during weekday off peak hours, and 58–62 minutes on the weekends. Trips roughly take 50–60 minutes.

Background
Routes F1 and F2 operates daily service between Cheverly station and Takoma station. Route F1 operates during weekdays only while the F2 operates weekdays during early mornings and late nights only and all day on weekends. Both routes operate the same pathway except in Mount Rainier where the F1 operates along Varnum Street and Eastern Avenue while the F2 operates along Russell Avenue, 28th Place, Upshur Street, Rainier Avenue, and 34th Street along TheBus Route 12 routing during hours it does not operate.

Routes F1 and F2 operates out of Landover division.

History
The Chillum Road Line was simply derived off its predecessor route known as the K6 New Hampshire Avenue–Suburban Line, which began operation in the 1940s as a Capital Transit Company bus route, and operated via New Hampshire Avenue between White Oak and the intersection of New Hampshire Avenue & Eastern Avenue NE in Chillum, Maryland.

Prior to February 19, 1978, F2 originally operated as part of the Michigan Avenue Line, alongside Route F4, between the intersection of 29th Street NE & Randolph Street NE (Mount Rainier) (F2)/ Eastern Avenue NE & Michigan Avenue NE (Avondale) (F4) and Archives in Downtown Washington D.C. It was initially a Capital Transit Company Bus Route in 1929, and then later on as a DC Transit Bus Route during the 1950s, well before becoming a WMATA Metrobus Route on February 4, 1973.

During the 1950s, the K6 was converted into a DC Transit Route, renamed as the, New Hampshire Avenue-Chillum Road Line and was extended from its terminus at the intersection of New Hampshire Avenue & Eastern Avenue N.E. in Chillum, Maryland to the intersection of 34th Street & Rhode Island Avenue in Mount Rainier, Maryland, via Eastern Avenue NE, Chillum Road, 19th Avenue, La Salle Road, Carson Circle, Queens Chapel Road, 25th Street, Arundel Road, Russell Avenue, 28th Place, Upshur Street, Rainier Avenue, 34th Street, Eastern Avenue NE, Rhode Island Avenue, and 34th Street.

In the late 1960s to early 1970's, the K6 was rerouted to operate on the New Hampshire Avenue corridor south of the intersection of Eastern Avenue NE towards Downtown Washington D.C. alongside the K2, K4, K7, & K9 DC Transit Bus Routes. DC Transit's East Washington Suburban Line Route B2, was extended from its terminus in Mount Rainier, MD to the intersection of Eastern Avenue NE & New Hampshire Avenue in Chillum, Maryland, via the K6's former routing, via 34th Street, Rainier Avenue, Upshur Street, 28th Place, Russell Avenue, Arundel Road, 25th Street, Queens Chapel Road, Carson Circle, La Salle Road, 19th Avenue, Chillum Road, and Eastern Avenue NE. Route B2 would remain on Chillum Road past the intersection of Eastern Avenue NE, and get onto to the intersection of Eastern Avenue NE, using 3rd Street NE, and New Hampshire Avenue NE. B2 was also extended south of its other terminus at the intersection of Pennsylvania Avenue SE & 17th Street SE in the Barney Circle neighborhood of Southeast Washington, D.C., up to the intersection of Martin Luther King Jr. Avenue SE & Good Hope Road SE in the Anacostia neighborhood of Southeast Washington D.C.

On February 4, 1973, both B2 & K6 became Metrobus Routes when WMATA bought DC Transit, which was struggling financially and merged it with three other failing bus companies throughout the Washington D.C. Metropolitan Area, to form its own, "Metrobus" System.

In July, 1977, shortly after the Stadium Armory and Potomac Avenue stations opened, B2 was truncated to only operate between the Potomac Avenue station and intersection of Eastern Avenue NE & New Hampshire Avenue in Chillum, Maryland. The segment of B2's routing between the Potomac Avenue station and Anacostia was replaced by both routes B4 and B5. While B4 would operate between Potomac Avenue and Anacostia, B5 would operate even further from Potomac Avenue to Barry Farm.

On February 19, 1978, route B2 was truncated to only operate between Mount Rainier, Maryland and Potomac Avenue station with the segment between Mount Rainier and Chillum, was replaced by route F2 which was renamed into the Chillum Road Line, which was rerouted to operated on the same routing as the B2 between both points, but was extended to operate further west on Eastern Avenue NE past the intersection of New Hampshire Avenue, and then via Carroll Street NW to serve the newly opened Takoma station.

On December 3, 1978, route F2 was extended from its terminus at Mount Rainier Terminal, to the newly opened Cheverly station, in order to replace route 88's routing between Mount Rainier and Cheverly, Maryland, via Rhode Island Avenue, 38th Street/38th Avenue, Bladensburg Road, Annapolis Road, Landover Road, Prince George's Hospital, Cheverly Avenue, and Columbia Park Road. A new route F3 was created to operate alongside the F2,  between the Takoma and Cheverly stations, except that the F3 would operate to Columbia Park, via Columbia Park Road, Kent Village Drive, Flagstaff Street, and East Marlboro Avenue.

On December 11, 1993, when West Hyattsville station opened, the line was changed where the F3 was discontinued and the F2 was rerouted to West Hyattsville and between Cheverly station & Prince George's Hospital via Columbia Park Road, Arbor Street, Tuxedo Road, Kenilworth Avenue Service Roadway, Kenilworth Avenue, Lydell Road, Pepsi Place, and Hospital Drive. F2 service along Columbia Park Road onto Cheverly Avenue, and then operating via Cheverly Avenue, Landover Road, and Hospital Drive was replaced by Route F13. Route F3 service between Cheverly and Columbia Park was replaced by Route F12.

On January 24, 1999, a new route F1 was created to operate alongside the F2 between Takoma and Cheverly stations, only with the exception that it would operate between the intersections of Rhode Island Avenue and Arundel Road in Mount Rainier, Maryland, via Eastern Avenue NE and Varnum Street rather than operating via F2's routing via Eastern Avenue NE, 34th Street, Rainier Avenue, Upshur Street, 28th Place, and Russell Avenue. Route F1 would operate on weekdays and Route F2 will operate during early morning, late night, and weekends when TheBus Route 12 is not operating.

During the COVID-19 pandemic, route F1 was suspended beginning on March 16, 2020, while route F2 operate on its Saturday schedule. However beginning on March 18, 2020, the route was further reduced to operate on its regular Sunday schedule with the supplemental trips not operating and having weekend service suspended. Route F1 resumed service on August 23, 2020, and route F2 was reverted to its regular operating hours.

References

F1
Orange Line (Washington Metro)
1978 establishments in Washington, D.C.